The 2011 NASL season was the first official season in FC Edmonton's existence. The club had played an exhibition season consisting of friendlies against various domestic and international opponents in 2010.

Club

Coaching staff

Squad

Transfers

In

Out

Competitions
Updated as published April 9, 2011.

Regular season

Standings
Overall

Matches

Pre-season

North American Soccer League regular season

North American Soccer League playoffs

Canadian Championship

Squad statistics

Players
Last updated for match on October 1, 2011.

|}

Formation

Disciplinary records
Only players with at least one card included.

Recognition

NASL Player of the Week

References

Edmonton
FC Edmonton seasons
Edmonton
FC Edmonton